Mirza Mohammad Afridi is a Pakistani politician who has been a Member of the Senate of Pakistan, since March 2018 and Deputy Chairman of the Senate of Pakistan since 12 March 2021.

Overview
Mirza Mohammad Afridi's name first emerged in the political arena at the highest level when he was independently elected a senator from the former FATA in 2018. He joined Pakistan Tehreek-e-Insaf in 2018 after meeting the Prime Minister Imran Khan at Banni Gala. He is also reported to have been associated with the Pakistan Muslim League (Nawaz). In this regard, the statement of PML-N leader Rana Sanaullah has also come to light that Mirza Muhammad Afridi had joined the Noon League after being elected as a senator in 2018. However, there are reports that the Election Commission and Senate websites have written independent candidates in their membership with reference to the 2018 Senate elections.
Mirza Muhammad Afridi belongs to the Sipah, a sub-branch of the Afridi tribe in the Khyber tribal region of Pakistan. Mirza Mohammad Afridi is the cousin of Peshawar Zalmi and Haier Company owner Javed Afridi and nephew of former Senator Haji Mohammad Shah Afridi. Mirza Muhammad Afridi is an industrialist and businessman. Local journalists from Khyber District reported that Mirza Mohammad Afridi's family left the area about 30 years ago and settled in Lahore. Education also continued there.

Political career
Afridi was elected to the Senate of Pakistan as an independent candidate on general seat from FATA and then joined Pakistan Muslim League in 2018 Pakistani Senate election. He joined Pakistan Tehreek-e-Insaf in 2018.

References

External links
 https://www.dawn.com/news/1428853

Living people
Members of the Senate of Pakistan
Independent politicians in Pakistan
Mirza Muhammad
Year of birth missing (living people)
Deputy chairmen of the Senate of Pakistan